Buzzy the Funny Crow is an animated cartoon character that first appeared in the Famous/Paramount Noveltoons cartoon, "Stupidstitious Cat" (1947). He went on to appear in 13 cartoons from 1947 to 1954, including Sock-a-Bye Kitty, As the Crow Lies, Cat-Choo, Better Bait Than Never and No Ifs, Ands or Butts.

Filmography
The Stupidstitious Cat (Apr-25-1947) Noveltoons
Cat O'Nie Ails (Jan-9-1948) Noveltoons (lost)
Winter Draws On (Mar-19-1948) Screen Songs
The Big Drip (Nov-25-1949) Screen Songs (Final Buzzy cartoon in the U.M. & M. TV Corporation package).
Sock-A-Bye Kitty (Dec-2-1950) Noveltoons with Katnip (First Buzzy cartoon in the HarveyToons package).
As The Crow Lies (June-1-1951) Noveltoons with Katnip.
Sing Again of Michigan (Jun-29-1951) Screen Songs
Cat-Choo (Oct-12-1951) Noveltoons with Katnip.
The Awful Tooth (May-2-1952) Noveltoons with Katnip.
Better Bait Than Never (Jun-5-1953) Noveltoons with Katnip.
Hair Today Gone Tomorrow (Apr-16-1954) Noveltoons with Katnip.
No Ifs, Ands, or Butts (Dec-17-1954) Noveltoons
Katnip's Big Day (Oct-30-1959) Herman and Katnip (guest appearance and the final cartoon )

References

Film characters introduced in 1947
Famous Studios series and characters
Animation based on real people